Chambers Glacier is a glacier in the Forrestal Range of the Pensacola Mountains, draining east from Mount Lechner and Kent Gap, at the juncture of Saratoga Table and Lexington Table, to enter Support Force Glacier. It was discovered and photographed on January 13, 1956, on a transcontinental patrol plane flight of U.S. Navy Operation Deep Freeze I from McMurdo Sound to the vicinity of the Weddell Sea and return. It was named by the Advisory Committee on Antarctic Names after Captain Washington I. Chambers, U.S. Navy, one of the pioneers in the development of the airplane catapult for ships.

See also
 List of glaciers in the Antarctic
 Glaciology

References

 

Glaciers of Queen Elizabeth Land